Kota Stone is a fine-grained variety of Kota limestone, quarried at Kota district, Rajasthan,  India. Hundreds of mines are located in or near the town of Ramganj Mandi and in the Kota district. 

The greenish-blue and brown colours of this stone contribute to its popularity. Other colors are black, pink, grey, and beige. When used for building, the stone is mainly used for exteriors, but will also work when used for interiors.

Limitations

Kota stone flakes, however, periodic polishing using polishing wax can eliminate this phenomenon. Since it is limestone, it is not resistant to acid and alkali. The stone is used throughout India, especially in government offices & institutions. It is a naturally available, fine-grained variety of limestone originating from Ramganj Mandi, Kota, Rajasthan.

Usage
 Indoor Flooring
 Outdoor Flooring
 Garden Paving
 Wall Cladding
 Waterproofing

See also 
Kota, Rajasthan
Kota limestone
Limestone